Charles William "Sandy" Piez (October 13, 1889 – December 29, 1930) was a Major League Baseball player who played for the New York Giants in . He was primarily used as a pinch runner, but also played as an outfielder. Piez died at age 41 when his car hit ice and skidded off a bridge and he promptly drowned.

External links

1889 births
1930 deaths
New York Giants (NL) players
Baseball players from New York (state)
Williamsport Millionaires players
Augusta Tourists players
Augusta Orphans players
Greenville Spinners players
Richmond Colts players
Rochester Hustlers players
Accidental deaths in New Jersey
Deaths by drowning in the United States
Road incident deaths in New Jersey